

Riga Central Station ( is the main railway station in Riga, Latvia. It is known as the main point of Riga due to its central location, and most forms of public transport stop in this area. Part of the building is a shopping centre.

Three rail mainlines depart the station to the east:
Riga–Skulte
Riga–Lugaži, through to the Estonian border crossing at Valka
Riga-Krustpils, which then splits into lines to Daugavpils and Zilupe, including international routes to the Russian, Belarusian & Lithuanian borders at Zilupe,  & Turmantas.
Two rail mainlines depart the station to the west:
Riga–Jelgava, including lines through to Liepāja & the Lithuanian border at Meitene
Riga–Tukums, including trains through to Ventspils

History 

The first railway station in Riga was constructed to serve as the western terminal station of the new railway line from Riga to Daugavpils which was financed by British contractors and led by British engineers. Construction of the station started in 1858, and the ceremony of laying the foundation stone on 21 May 1858 was attended by the Governor-General of the Baltic provinces Alexander Arkadyevich Suvorov. The station opened on 12 October 1861 along with the railway line, which connected Riga with Daugavpils and the Saint Petersburg–Warsaw railway line. The station building was designed by the architect Johann Felsko, and was a small building on two floors with two platforms and four tracks. In addition to railway facilities it also housed a telegraph office, a post office and a police station.

In 1868, the railway line from Riga to Jelgava opened, initially terminating at Torņakalns railway station on the left bank of the river Daugava. From 1872, however, all trains were continued from there via the Iron Bridge across the Daugava to the Riga II Station.

Due to the further expansion of the railway network, the old building became too small, and in 1885 the station was rebuilt and expanded with two large side wings following the project of the architect Heinrich Scheel. In 1889, a Neo-Byzantine style chapel was also built in front of the railway station to commemorate the miraculous survival of Emperor Alexander III and his family at the Borki train disaster in 1888.

Two separate stations were in operation in 19th century — one serving the line to Daugavpils and the other towards Jūrmala. They were joined and reconstructed in 1914 and functioned until the 1960s. In 1960 the current station building was opened and in 1965 — a second one. During the years, the station saw many reconstructions.

Future developments 

There exist plans to completely remodel the station in conjunction with the Rail Baltica project. A design by Danish architectural firms PLH Architects and COWI was selected in March 2017.

Other facilities
In the Central station building on the first floor there is Rimi supermarket. Directly nearby is Stockmann supermarket and the largest cinema in the city — Forum cinemas. In station there are a lot of popular restaurants such as "Čili pica", Hesburger etc. Opposite Marijas iela there is a McDonald's restaurant and few hotels.

Public transport
There are many stops at this location. The main stop is the railway station, Riga Central Station, which operates all passenger trains within Latvia. Most public transport stops are situated in the nearby streets — Marijas iela, Merķeļa iela, Satekles iela and 13. janvāra iela. Buses and trolleybuses stop here.

References

External links
 

Railway stations in Riga
Railway stations opened in 1861
19th-century establishments in Latvia
1861 establishments in the Russian Empire